The Menuhin Festival Gstaad is a music festival founded by the violinist Yehudi Menuhin held every summer since 1957 in the Swiss alpine town of Gstaad, after being asked by the director of tourism to "enhance the summer season with some concerts".

The Menuhin family settled in Gstaad in 1957, the year of the first Menuhin Festival Gstaad. It now consists of more than 50 concerts over a period of seven weeks, with a vast array of famous soloists and ensembles alike.

In 2012, it was held between Friday, 20 July and 8 September. Although Gstaad is the main focus of activities, many events take place in other venues in the Bernese Oberland. In 2012, the first concert was a recital by British violinist Julia Fischer in the church at Saanen. Other prominent soloists include pianist András Schiff, soprano Cecilia Bartoli, and cellist Sol Gabetta.

References

Classical music festivals in Switzerland